Haunt is a 2019 American slasher film written and directed by Scott Beck and Bryan Woods. The film stars Katie Stevens, Will Brittain, and Lauryn McClain. Set on a Halloween night, it follows a group of friends who encounter a haunted house that promises to feed on their darkest fears. The night turns deadly as they come to the horrifying realization that some nightmares are real.

Haunt premiered at Popcorn Frights Film Festival on August 8, 2019, and it had a limited release in the United States on September 13, by Momentum Pictures. The film received generally positive reviews from critics and grossed $2.4 million worldwide.

Plot
On Halloween night in Carbondale, Illinois, roommates Harper and Bailey attend a party together where they meet with their friends Angela and Mallory. The group befriends two guys, Nathan and Evan, at a local bar. Throughout the night, Harper suspects she is being stalked by a man in a devil mask. The group encounters a haunted house attraction. Before they enter, they are forced to surrender their cell phones and sign liability waivers.  The group becomes separated after entering a maze; Bailey, Nathan and Angela encounter a series of armholes. As Bailey sticks her arm inside, it is slashed with a straight razor. She also accidentally loses Harper's mom's ring, which she was wearing. Harper and Evan lose Mallory. They meet back up with the others and witness a performer in a witch mask impale Mallory through the head with a hot fire poker.

Now believing they are in danger, the group sends Nathan to find an exit. He encounters a man in a ghost mask, "Mitch", who agrees to help. Devil Mask kills Angela. Bailey flees into the tunnels and accidentally activates the trap door, dropping Nathan into the house's operation rooms. He saves Harper from Devil Mask before finding the group's phones. Evan and Mitch make it outside, but Mitch kills him with a hammer before ripping off his face.

Nathan manages to give the location of the house to Harper's abusive boyfriend, Sam, before making it out of the house. Harper enters an escape room very similar to her childhood bedroom where she witnessed her father abuse her mother. Devil Mask attacks her and she kills him. She then encounters another performer in a skull mask and kills them too, but is horrified to find that the person in the costume was Bailey, who was previously captured by the other performers. Sam arrives at the house, where he is promptly killed by the attraction's ringleader, a man in a clown mask.

Nathan goes back inside to save the others but is attacked by Mitch, while Harper is attacked by a man in a zombie mask. She defeats her attacker before helping Nathan kill Mitch. They encounter a man in a vampire mask, who explains that the performers are part of a cult that makes extreme modifications to their faces to look like real monsters, and like to rip the faces off their victims. He is shot to death by Zombie Mask. Harper and Nathan escape the house, killing Witch Mask in the process. Zombie Mask attacks them but Nathan kills him before the two escape in Sam's truck. Clown Mask proceeds to burn down the attraction. Harper and Nathan reach a hospital, where the nurse asks Harper to write her address on a release form similar to the one they were asked to sign before entering the house.

Sometime later, Clown Mask arrives at Harper's house with the intent of killing her, but becomes stuck in a trap by Harper, who emerges with a shotgun and kills him.

Cast

Production
In July 2017, it was announced Scott Beck and Bryan Woods, would write and direct the film. The film would be produced by Eli Roth, Todd Garner, Mark Fasano, Ankur Rungta, Vishal Rungta and executive produced by Nick Meyer, Marc Schaberg, Josie Liang, Jeremy Stein and Tobias Weymar. In October 2017, Katie Stevens, Will Brittain, Lauryn McClain, Andrew Caldwell, and Shazi Raja joined the cast of the film.

Principal photography began in October 2017 in Covington, Kentucky. Production concluded in November 2017.

Release
The film had its world premiere at Popcorn Frights Film Festival on August 8, 2019 in Fort Lauderdale, Florida and its international premiere at FrightFest in London, England, on August 23, 2019. The Los Angeles premiere for Haunt took place at the Grauman's Egyptian Theatre on September 7, 2019. The film received a limited release on September 13, 2019, by Momentum Pictures. Haunt later premiered on Shudder, where it was ranked the #1 most watched movie premiere of 2019.

Critical response
The site's critics consensus reads: "Haunt is spooked by the spirits of its obvious influences, but still packs enough thrills and chills to satisfy horror fans up for a haunted house excursion." On Metacritic, the film has a weighted average score of 69 out of 100, based on 5 critics, indicating "generally positive reviews".

Albert Nowicki included the film on his list of "best Halloween movies of all time" for Prime Movies.

References

External links
 
 
 

2010s slasher films
2019 films
2019 horror films
2019 horror thriller films
American horror thriller films
American slasher films
Films directed by Scott Beck and Bryan Woods
Films produced by Eli Roth
Films scored by Tomandandy
Films set in Illinois
Films shot in Kentucky
Halloween horror films
2010s English-language films
2010s American films